Super Bowl LII was an American football game played to determine the champion of the National Football League (NFL) for the 2017 season. The National Football Conference (NFC) champion Philadelphia Eagles defeated the American Football Conference (AFC) and defending Super Bowl LI champion New England Patriots, 41–33, to win their first Super Bowl and their first NFL title since 1960. The game was played on February 4, 2018, at U.S. Bank Stadium in Minneapolis, Minnesota. This was the second time that a Super Bowl was played in Minneapolis, the northernmost city to ever host the event, after Super Bowl XXVI at the Metrodome during the 1991 season. It was also the sixth Super Bowl held in a cold-weather city.

New England finished the regular season with an AFC-best 13–3 record, then extended their record Super Bowl appearances to ten, their third in four years, and their eighth under the leadership of head coach Bill Belichick and MVP quarterback Tom Brady. Philadelphia also finished the regular season with an NFC-best 13–3 record but entered the playoffs as underdogs after starting quarterback Carson Wentz suffered a season-ending injury late in the regular season; prior to his injury, Wentz was the media and fan favorite to win MVP after leading his team to an 11–2 start. Backup quarterback Nick Foles was the Eagles' starting quarterback for the rest of the season. With Foles, the Eagles advanced to their third Super Bowl appearance, having previously lost to the Oakland Raiders in Super Bowl XV and to the Patriots in Super Bowl XXXIX.

Several records were set during Super Bowl LII, including most yards gained in an NFL game by both teams combined (1,151) and fewest punts from both teams in a Super Bowl (one). The game was settled after the Eagles converted a fumble recovery deep within Patriots territory to a field goal with 1:05 remaining to extend their lead to eight points, and Brady's Hail Mary pass fell incomplete as time expired. Foles, who completed 28 of 43 pass attempts for 373 yards and three touchdowns with one interception, and also caught a one-yard touchdown pass on a trick play, was named Super Bowl MVP. Foles' touchdown catch later became known as the Philly Special and joined NFL lore alongside his unexpected performance.

With the loss, the Patriots became the fifth defending Super Bowl champions to lose in the following year's title game, after the 1978 Dallas Cowboys, the 1983 Washington Redskins, the 1997 Green Bay Packers, and the 2014 Seattle Seahawks, and would be followed by the 2020 Kansas City Chiefs.

The broadcast of the game on NBC had the smallest Super Bowl audience in nine years, with an average of 103.4 million viewers. Average television viewership for the halftime show, headlined by Justin Timberlake, was 106.6 million American television viewers, 9 percent less than the previous year. This was the most recent Super Bowl to date where both teams attained at least one score each quarter until 2023, a Super Bowl which also involved the Eagles. The game is also considered one of the greatest Super Bowl games of all time.

Background

Host-city selection

On October 8, 2013, the league announced that three venues were vying to host Super Bowl LII:
 U.S. Bank Stadium in Minneapolis, Minnesota. Minneapolis hosted Super Bowl XXVI in 1992 at the Hubert H. Humphrey Metrodome, which was torn down after the 2013 season and replaced in 2016 by U.S. Bank Stadium.
 Lucas Oil Stadium in Indianapolis, Indiana. The stadium hosted Super Bowl XLVI in 2012.
 Mercedes-Benz Superdome in New Orleans, Louisiana. The city has hosted 10 Super Bowls, including seven at the Superdome, most recently Super Bowl XLVII in 2013.

On May 20, 2014, the league's owners picked Minneapolis at their meeting in Atlanta, Georgia.

Teams
The NFC was represented by the number-one playoff seed Philadelphia Eagles, while the AFC was represented by the number-one playoff seed New England Patriots, marking the fourth time in the previous five years that the Super Bowl had featured the top team from each conference.

Philadelphia Eagles

The Eagles finished the regular season with a record of 13–3, the same as New England, Minnesota, and Pittsburgh, but the various tie-breaking provisions gave them the NFC's top seed in the 2017–18 NFL playoffs. It was a substantial improvement for the team under second-year head coach Doug Pederson; the Eagles finished the previous season with a 7–9 record. In the 2017 season, the team scored 457 points (third in the NFL), while giving up just 295 (fourth) points.

The offense was led by Pro Bowl quarterback Carson Wentz. In just his second season, he recorded a passer rating of 101.9, throwing for 3,296 yards and 33 touchdowns, with only seven interceptions. His top target was Pro Bowl tight end Zach Ertz, who caught 74 passes for 824 yards and eight touchdowns. Other contributors were two receivers acquired from off-season free agency: Alshon Jeffery, who caught 57 passes for 789 yards and nine scores; and Torrey Smith, who had 36 receptions for 430 yards. Meanwhile, third-year receiver Nelson Agholor had the best season of his career, hauling in 62 passes for 768 yards and eight touchdowns, a higher total in each category than in his previous two seasons combined. The Eagles rushing attack also benefited from two recently acquired players, LeGarrette Blount and Jay Ajayi. Blount, an off-season signing who won a Super Bowl with the Patriots, gained 776 rushing yards and two touchdowns, while Ajayi, picked up by a mid-season trade with the Miami Dolphins, rushed for 873 yards and caught 24 passes for 154 yards combined with the two teams. Philadelphia also had a superb offensive line, led by two Pro Bowl selections: Tackle Lane Johnson and Guard Brandon Brooks, along with all pro center Jason Kelce.

The Eagles defense allowed the fourth-fewest yards in the league (4,904). Defensive tackle Fletcher Cox made the Pro Bowl for the third time in his career, recording 5 sacks and two fumble recoveries, and he had plenty of help around him, such as former Patriots defensive end Chris Long, who had five sacks and forced four fumbles, and defensive end Brandon Graham, who led the team with 9 sacks. Middle linebacker Nigel Bradham led the team in combined tackles with 88. The Eagles secondary featured Pro Bowl safety Malcolm Jenkins, who had 76 combined tackles and two interceptions, along with cornerback Patrick Robinson, who led the team with four interceptions.

Philadelphia had stormed to the top of the NFC by winning 10 of their first 12 games, but suffered a major setback on December 10, when Wentz went down with a season-ending ACL tear and was replaced by journeyman backup quarterback Nick Foles, who was playing for his third team in as many years and his second stint with the Eagles. After Wentz's injury, many analysts wrote off the remainder of the Eagles' season as they believed they would not recover from his loss. Surprising analysts, Foles was able to lead the team to victory in that game, as well as the next two. The Eagles rested Foles and were led by third-string quarterback Nate Sudfeld for their meaningless game against the Cowboys in Week 17, a game they lost, but in the Eagles' two playoff games, Foles threw for a combined total of 598 yards, three touchdowns and no interceptions, replicating the excellent performance of Wentz to carry the Eagles to the NFC title. The Eagles were not favored to win in any of their 2018 playoff appearances including Super Bowl LII. The team embraced their role as underdogs and were frequently seen wearing dog masks after each playoff victory as were their fans.

New England Patriots

The Patriots entered the 2017 NFL season as defending Super Bowl champions. For the 16th time in their 18 seasons under head coach Bill Belichick, they recorded a double-digit win season, finishing the regular season with a record of 13–3 and, by virtue of tie-breaking procedures, earning the AFC's number one overall seed. The previous season's top wide receiver Julian Edelman went down in the preseason with a season-ending injury. Early season defensive struggles left the team with a 2–2 record after four weeks, and the worst overall defense in the league at that point. The defense came together as a unit, and tightened up over the rest of the season however, with the Patriots going 11–1 after week 4. Their sole loss in the latter part of the season came in Week 14 to the Miami Dolphins, a division rival, though they were without star tight end Rob Gronkowski due to a one-game suspension for an unnecessary roughness call the prior week. The Patriots' defense was improved by several late-season free-agent signings, including Eric Lee, a defensive end, previously from the Buffalo Bills, whom the Patriots signed in Week 12, and James Harrison, a perennial All-Pro for the Pittsburgh Steelers, whom the Patriots picked up off waivers after Christmas. In just six games for New England, Lee recorded 3 sacks, a safety, and an interception. In his only regular season game with the Patriots, Harrison recorded two sacks.

During the regular season, New England's offense led the league in yards gained (6,307) and ranked second in points scored (458). The 40-year-old Brady finished his 18th season with a league-leading 4,577 passing yards, 32 touchdowns and just eight interceptions, earning him his 13th selection to the Pro Bowl and his third league MVP award. One change that helped make up for the loss of Edelman was the acquisition of receiver Brandin Cooks, who caught 65 passes for 1,082 yards and seven touchdowns. Brady was also aided by the healthy return of Gronkowski, who had played just eight games in the previous season, finishing this year with 69 catches for 1,084 yards and eight scores. Receiver Danny Amendola added 61 receptions for 659 yards, as well as another 240 yards returning punts. With the loss of their previous season's rushing leader LeGarrette Blount to free agency, Dion Lewis stepped up to take the lead, rushing for 896 yards and six touchdowns despite starting only eight games. He also caught 32 passes for 214 yards and two touchdowns and added 570 yards and another touchdown returning kickoffs. Rex Burkhead chipped in 518 all-purpose yards, 30 receptions, and eight touchdowns. In passing situations, the team relied heavily on running back James White, who caught 56 passes for 429 yards and rushed for 171 on the ground. These backs were aided by the blocking of fullback James Develin, who earned his first Pro Bowl selection. On special teams, kicker Stephen Gostkowski ranked second in the NFL with 156 points and fourth in field goals made with 37, while veteran special team ace Matthew Slater earned his seventh consecutive Pro Bowl selection.

The Patriots' defense ranked only 29th in yards allowed (5,856), but ranked fifth in fewest points, giving up only 296. Defensive end Trey Flowers led the team with 6 sacks while also forcing two fumbles. Linebacker Kyle Van Noy had 73 tackles and 5 sacks. The Patriots also had a superb secondary, led by cornerbacks Malcolm Butler (two interceptions, three forced fumbles) and Stephon Gilmore (two interceptions, 47 solo tackles), as well as safeties Devin McCourty (97 combined tackles, one interception, one fumble recovery), Patrick Chung (84 tackles, one interception, two fumble recoveries) and Duron Harmon (four interceptions).

Playoffs

In the playoffs, the Patriots earned a first-round bye and home-field advantage due to their status as the AFC's first overall seed. In the divisional round, they defeated the Tennessee Titans 35–14, as Brady passed for 337 yards and three touchdowns. In that game, the defense amassed eight quarterback sacks of Marcus Mariota and held the Titans' running game to 65 yards rushing. They then defeated the Jacksonville Jaguars 24–20 in the AFC Championship Game, rallying from behind to win the game after the Jaguars jumped out to an early 14–3 lead and whose league-best defense stymied Brady and the rest of the offense for most of the first half. Down 20–10 in the fourth quarter, the Patriots' comeback was sealed by two Brady-led drives, both resulting in touchdown passes to Danny Amendola, as well as a key defensive stop by Stephon Gilmore, whose acrobatic block of a Blake Bortles pass ended Jacksonville's last chance to score. Rob Gronkowski was injured in the game with a concussion, leaving his status for the Super Bowl in doubt. Amendola was the breakout star for the Patriots during their two playoff wins, leading the team with 196 receiving yards, and serving as Brady's primary target.

Philadelphia also earned a first-round bye and home-field advantage as the NFC's first overall seed. They started off the divisional round by narrowly defeating the Atlanta Falcons 15–10, stopping the Falcons on four consecutive plays after the Falcons had a first-down-and-goal situation on the Eagles' 9-yard line during their final drive. They then soundly defeated the Minnesota Vikings 38–7 in the NFC Championship Game. Despite the Vikings scoring on their opening drive, the Eagles' defense held them to three punts, two turnovers on downs, two interceptions, and one lost fumble in their remaining drives of the game. Meanwhile, Foles had a great game, in which he completed 26 of 33 passes for 353 yards and three touchdowns.

Pre-game notes
This game was a rematch of Super Bowl XXXIX. Only one player, Patriots starting quarterback Tom Brady, remained on either roster from that contest. Bill Belichick, the Patriots' head coach in that contest, also remained in that position. Two Eagles, running back LeGarrette Blount and defensive lineman Chris Long, had been Patriots in 2017's Super Bowl LI. The Eagles were 1–4 against the Brady/Belichick era Patriots prior to this game (preseason notwithstanding), including Super Bowl XXXIX, their one win being a 35–28 win at Gillette Stadium in December during their relatively weak 2015 season, where after falling behind 14–0, they proceeded to rally for 35 points and hold them down to only two more touchdowns on their end to win, allowing them to finally get their first revenge for eleven years prior.

The Patriots were the designated home team for Super Bowl LII, because the AFC team is the designated home team in even-numbered years and the NFC team in odd-numbered years. As the designated home team, the Patriots chose to wear their road white jerseys with navy blue pants, becoming the sixth team to wear their white jerseys as the home team and the third team to wear white in back-to-back Super Bowls, following the Dallas Cowboys in Super Bowls XII and XIII and again in Super Bowls XXVII and XXVIII. The Eagles therefore wore their standard home uniform of midnight green jerseys with white pants. Twelve of the previous 13 Super Bowls had been won by teams wearing white jerseys. The last team to win a Super Bowl while wearing their home uniforms was the Green Bay Packers in Super Bowl XLV (who, coincidentally, had also worn green jerseys).

Gambling establishments had the Patriots as 5 ½ point favorites and projected 47 ½ points scored.

Operations

To coordinate the game and 10 days of events, the National Football League temporarily operated an events office within the Minnesota Vikings office building next to U.S. Bank Stadium. More than 150,000 visitors were expected to attend events associated with the Super Bowl over ten days. Among them were some 5,000-plus media members; media day events and press conferences were held at The Mall of America in Bloomington, Minnesota.

No sales tax was collected on admission tickets to the game and related events, including parking.

To increase security around U.S. Bank Stadium, the stadium's light rail station was shut down for 48 hours before the game, and a nearby homeless shelter was temporarily moved beyond the security perimeter. The Blue Line of the light rail system was only open to ticketholders and passengers with a Gameday Pass, while the Green Line only ran to Stadium Village station on the University of Minnesota campus before continuing on with restricted access. Metro Transit ran shuttle buses between light rail stations, as well as regular bus service was moved for several weeks due to street closures. Thirty activist groups organized a rally and protest against police brutality, corporate greed, and racist practices. 17 people blocked the Green Line train for 90 minutes before the game, and 200 protesters blocked an entrance to the stadium's security perimeter.

Under a 1998 agreement, the Patriots and Eagles owners split the tickets, and the league controlled the game presentation and entertainment in the stadium. The Patriots practiced at the Minnesota Vikings facilities in Eden Prairie while the Eagles used the University of Minnesota. The Eagles got the Vikings' locker room and sideline. The Vikings had advanced to the NFC Championship Game before losing to the Eagles; until that point, the possibility of the Vikings advancing to the Super Bowl and thus becoming the first team to play the game in its home stadium was plausible. Had that happened, the Vikings would have used their own locker rooms and training facilities, while the AFC champion would have used the University of Minnesota.

Associated events

The Minnesota Super Bowl Host Committee presented Super Bowl Live on Nicollet Mall in downtown Minneapolis. This ten-day free festival and concert series featured Sheila E., The Revolution, Morris Day and The Time, and The New Power Generation, musicians from Minnesota who collaborated with Prince, a Minneapolis native. Produced by Jimmy Jam and Terry Lewis, Super Bowl Live also included performances by Idina Menzel, Soul Asylum, the Suburbs, Bob Mould, Sounds of Blackness, Dessa, VocalEssence, Mint Condition, and the Jets. In addition to the concert series, Super Bowl Live featured a  American Birkebeiner International Bridge on Nicollet Mall to showcase cross-country skiing, skijoring, fat-tire bicycle racing, and snow tubing demonstrations. There was also a snowmobile stunt show on February 3.

The NFL presented the Super Bowl Experience at the Minneapolis Convention Center from January 27 to February 3 with an entrance fee. Kelly Clarkson performed at the Minneapolis Armory and a U.S. Bank Stadium lounge on the day of the Super Bowl.

The Minneapolis Armory also hosted Jennifer Lopez, Imagine Dragons, and Pink concerts close to U.S. Bank Stadium. Pink also performed the national anthem before the Super Bowl. Halftime performer Justin Timberlake held a ticketed "listening session" of his newest album at Prince's Paisley Park. Dave Matthews Band performed at Xcel Energy Center in Saint Paul. The Shakopee Mdewakanton Sioux Community's Mystic Lake Casino hosted Gwen Stefani, the Chainsmokers, Florida Georgia Line, and Kygo. Planners originally scheduled a  traveling nightclub for 9500 people, but cancelled, moving its concerts into the main casino. Ellie Goulding's appearance with Kygo was cancelled at the same time. The Mystic Lake Casino in Prior Lake, Minnesota, has the second-largest hotel in the Twin Cities metropolitan area, and Prior Lake hosted Super Bowl-week events including winter activities, a hotdish competition, and fundraisers.

Other events were held at the Mall of America (including Radio Row as a home for national shows), Saint Paul's RiverCentre and Xcel Energy Center, the Minnesota Vikings' Winter Park location in Eden Prairie, and the University of Minnesota. "Taste of the NFL" is a fundraiser for food banks and was held in Saint Paul. Minneapolis also offered a temporary zip-line across the Mississippi River near downtown. The Luminary Loppet around Lake of the Isles in Minneapolis featured fire dancing, an ice pyramid, and luminary candles at night.

The 2018 Saint Paul Winter Carnival took place leading up to, during and after the Super Bowl. Carnival organizers built a large ice palace to coincide with the Super Bowl festivities, as with Super Bowl XXVI in 1992. The ice palace was planned, cancelled for lack of funds, then re-announced with sponsors. Events in Saint Paul also included an extreme sports demonstration, a "giant slide", and a block party. Officials in the capital city hoped to attract Minneapolis Super Bowl visitors. The Minneapolis Institute of Art had a free ,  ice maze.

The Great Northern was a winter festival in the Twin Cities from January 25 to February 4 that included the U.S. Pond Hockey Championships, an ice bar, and an "urban ski competition".

ESPN broadcast its studio programming from the IDS Center in downtown Minneapolis, while Golf Channel (a sister network of Super Bowl LII broadcaster NBC) aired two live episodes of David Feherty's eponymous interview show from the State Theatre.

Native American communities of Minnesota performed nightly drum ceremonies. Various drumlines from around the state performed at different locations throughout the day.

Marketing 
The slogan Bold North was developed by the Minnesota Super Bowl Host Committee to promote Super Bowl LII and its surrounding festivities. The slogan was intended to represent an embrace of the region's climate as part of its identity, and was used on merchandise and by the host committee's official sponsors. The NFL unveiled the official logo for Super Bowl LII (a cerulean-colored version of a standardized design) prior to Super Bowl LI, and the official branding elements and secondary logo in October 2017—featuring blue and purple aurora motifs.

Broadcasting

United States
NBC broadcast Super Bowl LII as part of an annual cycle between the three main broadcast television partners of the NFL; it was the first time NBC aired the Super Bowl with the Winter Olympics (NBC later announced that it would air all future Super Bowls in Winter Olympic years). NBC's lead NFL team of play-by-play man Al Michaels and color analyst Cris Collinsworth called the game. Sister cable network Universo carried a full Spanish language broadcast produced by Telemundo Deportes, with Edgar Lopez and Rene Giraldo. The Universo Spanish audio was also available on NBC through the SAP channel, where available. NBC employed 73 cameras within the stadium, and introduced "volumetric-AR" graphics featuring 3D body scanning of players, and a new on-air graphics package to be used exclusively for Sunday Night Football going forward.

This was the last game in Westwood One's national radio contract with the NFL before a quiet renewal on undermined terms after the season and Cumulus exited a chapter 11 bankruptcy filing made just before the Super Bowl. Each participating team's flagship station (the Patriots Radio Network's WBZ-FM/Boston, and the Eagles Radio Network's WIP-FM/Philadelphia, along with WEMG/Camden, New Jersey for Spanish play-by-play) carried the game with local announcers. (For the second consecutive year, none of the local flagships are clear-channel stations, and thus the local commentators were only audible for free within each respective team's immediate metropolitan area; listeners who live outside the flagship stations' broadcast ranges were required to subscribe to Sirius XM Radio or TuneIn Premium to access the local broadcasts.) Under the terms of the Westwood One contract, any radio station that is not a local flagship, if it is to carry the game, is required to utilize the Westwood One feed. It was the first title win called by Eagles play-by-play announcer Merrill Reese, who has been the primary radio voice of the team since 1977.

Online streams of the game were provided by NBC. It was available on NBCSports.com, the NBC Sports app for mobile devices, tablets, connected-TV devices, and NBC.com without any required login. The Spanish-language broadcast was available on the Telemundo Deportes En Vivo app and TelemundoDeportes.com for desktop devices, connected TV devices, and tablets but not mobile devices. Under new digital rights deals that began with the 2017–18 playoffs, Verizon still offers mobile streaming of games, but no longer holds exclusive rights to stream NFL games on smartphones or make them exclusive to Verizon Wireless subscribers. Instead, Verizon elected to use the deal to bolster its recent acquisition of Yahoo!; on January 9, 2018, Verizon announced that it would host streams of playoff games through the Yahoo! Sports and go90 app, including Super Bowl LII. As a result of the deal, the online stream was available to viewers on all Internet devices for the first time, regardless of network (because of Verizon's previous exclusive rights deal, non-Verizon phones had previously been blocked from receiving any NFL telecasts, regardless of source). The game was also available through the NFL Mobile app with the aforementioned change to viewing through the app now being allowed on all mobile carriers.

Dan Patrick and Liam McHugh served as the lead hosts for NBC's pre-game coverage. Mike Tirico, who replaced the retiring Bob Costas in 2017 as NBC's lead studio host for both the NFL and the Olympic Games, did not participate in coverage of Super Bowl LII due to his commitments to the 2018 Winter Olympics in Pyeongchang, South Korea (which opened on the Friday following the game).

As NBC Sports Regional Networks operates regional sports networks in the markets of both teams which participated, the NBC Sports Boston and NBC Sports Philadelphia channels were used to provide additional coverage of the game from a local perspective. Both networks aired coverage from Minneapolis, including specials focusing on their respective teams, and a jointly-produced pre-game show aired by both channels.

Nielsen reported a 47.4/70% overnight rating in metered markets, peaking at 52.2/74 during the fourth quarter. These numbers are about 3% lower than early numbers from Super Bowl LI, and the lowest since Super Bowl XLIV in 2010.

NBC was scheduled to broadcast Super Bowl LV, their next scheduled Super Bowl at the time, but the network traded the broadcasting rights to CBS in 2019 following Super Bowl LIII the following year to avoid counterprogramming against the Olympics and the Super Bowl, and would not air a Super Bowl again until two years after the trading deal, when they broadcast Super Bowl LVI from SoFi Stadium in Los Angeles.

Advertising
Dan Lovinger, NBC Sports Group executive vice president of ad sales, stated to Variety in July 2017 that the network was seeking a price "north of $5 million" (the price set for the previous two Super Bowls) for a 30-second commercial during Super Bowl LII. As they began five days after the Super Bowl, NBC offered advertising packages that covered both Super Bowl LII and the 2018 Winter Olympics (which marked the first time since 1992 that a single broadcast network had aired both the Super Bowl and Winter Olympics in the same year); the network estimated that it would bring in at least $1 billion in advertising revenue from the two events. During the second quarter, an equipment failure caused NBC's broadcast to experience dead air for 30 seconds during a commercial break. No actual commercial time was lost.

Advertisements for Tide detergent featuring David Harbour of Stranger Things created a recurring theme, appearing in each quarter, often disguised as well-known commercials for other products, with Harbour eventually declaring "It's a Tide ad." Anheuser-Busch has, as it has done in previous Super Bowls, purchased multiple commercials in the game, advertising Bud Light, Stella Artois and Michelob Ultra. For the first time since Super Bowl VIII, the company reduced the appearances of the Budweiser Clydesdales in a Super Bowl commercial, with the 60-second Budweiser commercial for this event instead focusing on a Budweiser factory plant in Georgia distributing water, referencing the beer maker's efforts to distribute water to families of victims affected by natural disasters, such as wildfires and hurricanes. However, a Clydesdale was featured in a commercial for Tide detergent and the Budweiser Clydesdales only appeared in a five-second Budweiser commercial to remind viewers of the "ClydesdaleCam" livestream event. Other signed advertisers included The Coca-Cola Company and Avocados from Mexico. Cellphone carrier T-Mobile aired a minute long ad with actress Kerry Washington narrating, featuring babies of various ethnic backgrounds. The commercial also features Nirvana's song "All Apologies" played as a lullaby. In the ad, Washington talks about the babies being born with natural instincts of love and not racism calling them "unstoppable" and that they will demand fair and equal pay. T-Mobile CEO John Legere posted to his Twitter account afterwards saying, "This year, we wanted to use our #SuperBowl airtime to share that @TMobile believes we all started in the same place. We are more alike than different. And we are unstoppable."

Fiat Chrysler subsidiary Ram Trucks was met with criticism over its ad "Built to Serve", which featured an excerpt from Martin Luther King Jr.'s "Drum Major Instinct" sermon on the virtues of serving others (February 4, 2018 was also the 50th anniversary of the sermon). The ad was considered an exploitation of King's words to sell a product, with media outlets noting that the sermon in the ad went on to specifically criticize advertisers (including automobile manufacturers) for being "gentlemen of massive verbal persuasion".

Lead-out programs
NBC's lead-out program was an episode of This Is Us, titled "Super Bowl Sunday", alongside a special episode of The Tonight Show Starring Jimmy Fallon from Minneapolis' Orpheum Theatre, with halftime performer Justin Timberlake, Dwayne Johnson, Chris Stapleton and the cast of This Is Us as guests.

In a surprise move, Netflix used its advertising time to announce that The Cloverfield Paradox — the third film in the Cloverfield series — would be available for streaming on the service immediately after the game, potentially undercutting viewership of the lucrative post-game slot on NBC.

International broadcasts

Entertainment

Pre-game

The Super Bowl flyover was a unique combination of airplanes – and a first for the Superbowl games. It was  the first time the Heritage Flight team conducted a flyover for a Super Bowl. 
The U.S. Air Force Heritage Flight performed a flawless execution perfectly timed with Pink's National Anthem. It consisted of one F-16 Fighting Falcon, two A-10 Thunderbolt IIs, and one P-51 Mustang flying in formation over U.S. Bank Stadium.

Pink performed "The Star-Spangled Banner", while Leslie Odom Jr. sang "America the Beautiful". Pink spit out a throat lozenge shortly before singing the anthem, later verified after many commentators thought she had spit out a piece of gum. She reported being ill with flu symptoms during her performance. No players were observed kneeling during the national anthem, in contrast to the protests that happened earlier in the 2016 and 2017 seasons.

Fifteen Medal of Honor recipients participated in the coin toss ceremony. World War II hero Hershel W. Williams was the honorary captain and had the honors of flipping the coin.

Halftime show

Justin Timberlake headlined the Super Bowl LII halftime show, along with his band "The Tennessee Kids" and featuring the University of Minnesota Marching Band. Timberlake performed in two previous Super Bowls: Super Bowl XXXV in 2001 as a member of NSYNC, and Super Bowl XXXVIII in 2004 with Janet Jackson.

Timberlake's performance drew criticism for not being "spectacular", looking to be safe and avoid incidents such as the infamous "wardrobe malfunction" encountered during his performance with Jackson, and for incorporating a video of Prince, who opposed performances combining the dead and the living.

Game summary

First half

The New England Patriots won the opening coin toss and elected to defer to the second half. The Patriots kicked off to the Eagles, who opened the game with a 14-play, 67-yard drive that took 7:05 off the clock and resulted in a 25-yard Jake Elliott field goal, giving the Eagles a 3–0 lead. The drive was controlled by the arm of Eagles quarterback Nick Foles, who completed 6 of 9 passes to five different receivers for 61 yards, with a few short runs by LeGarrette Blount and Jay Ajayi mixed in. Foles also made two critical completions on third down plays, hitting Alshon Jeffery for a 17-yard gain on third-and-4, and later found Torrey Smith for a 15-yard completion on third-and-12. The Patriots responded with a drive of their own, almost with exactly the same results; quarterback Tom Brady completed 6 of 8 passes for 60 yards to four different receivers, the longest a 28-yard strike to Chris Hogan. The drive stalled out on the Eagles 8-yard line, where they had to settle for Stephen Gostkowski's 26-yard field goal, which tied the game at 3–3. The game's first touchdown was scored by the Eagles on the next drive, taking only three plays: a short pass from Foles to Nelson Agholor, a 36-yard run up the middle by Blount, and a 34-yard touchdown pass from Foles to Jeffery to the left side of the field. The ensuing extra point attempt from Elliott was missed wide right, which made the score 9–3 in favor of the Eagles. The Patriots responded by advancing the ball to the Philadelphia 11-yard line on their next drive, which was set up by a 50-yard completion from Brady to Danny Amendola, where the quarter ended.

With the second quarter under way, the Patriots came away empty-handed on the drive, as Gostkowski missed a 26-yard field goal attempt after holder Ryan Allen mishandled the snap. New England's defense forced the game's only punt on the next drive. On the following drive, Brady completed a 23-yard pass to Brandin Cooks, but a hard hit by defender Malcolm Jenkins knocked the receiver out of the game with a concussion. On third down from near mid-field, the Patriots attempted a trick play that involved two handoffs and a pass downfield to Tom Brady. Brady was open, but dropped the throw from Amendola. They went for it on fourth down, and a pass intended for tight end Rob Gronkowski fell incomplete, giving the Eagles the ball on their own 35-yard line on a turnover-on-downs. The Eagles capitalized on a drive featuring two key completions, a 19-yard catch by Zach Ertz on third-and-7, and a 22-yard reception by Jeffery on the Patriots 21-yard line. On the next play, a 21-yard rumble by Blount gave the Eagles another touchdown. They attempted a two-point conversion, which failed, making the score 15–3. The Patriots quickly struck back, as Brady completed a 46-yard pass to Rex Burkhead on the first play after the kickoff. But the team could only gain two more yards, resulting in Gostkowski's 45-yard field goal that got the score to 15–6.

The Eagles got the ball back with 7:24 on the clock and looked poised to score another touchdown after a 26-yard run by Ajayi gave them a first down on the Patriots 43-yard line. But on the next play, Foles threw a pass that bounced off Jeffery as he tried to make a one-handed catch, and went into the hands of Patriots safety Duron Harmon for an interception, which he returned eight yards to the 10-yard line. The Patriots took advantage of the turnover with a seven-play, 90-yard drive, featuring a 43-yard completion from Brady to Hogan. On the next play, James White scored with a 26-yard touchdown run. Gostkowski missed the ensuing extra point, but the score was now 15–12. Eagles running back Kenjon Barner returned the ensuing kickoff 27 yards to his own 30-yard line as time ran down to the two-minute warning. Two plays later, on third-and-3, Foles completed a short pass to running back Corey Clement, who took off for a 55-yard gain to the New England 8-yard line. Clement then ran the ball six yards to the two-yard line on the next play. Two plays later, Philadelphia faced fourth-and-goal on the 1-yard line with 38 seconds left on the clock. Deciding to go for the touchdown, they attempted a similar trick play to the one that had failed for the Patriots earlier, in what would become the most memorable play of the game. As Foles stepped up to the running back position, Clement took a direct snap and pitched the ball to tight end Trey Burton, who then threw the ball perfectly to Foles, who was wide open in the right side of the end zone. Foles caught the ball, making him the first quarterback ever to catch a touchdown pass in a Super Bowl, and the ensuing extra point was good, giving the Eagles a 22–12 lead, which was taken into the locker room after a short drive by the Patriots. The play came to be known as the Philly Special.

The first half resulted in numerous Super Bowl records from both teams, including most total yards combined (673). This was also the first time two quarterbacks had thrown for over 200 yards in the first half of a Super Bowl, with Brady throwing for 276 yards and Foles 215.

Second half
The Patriots received the second-half kickoff and Brady led New England 75 yards in eight plays. Gronkowski, who caught only one pass for nine yards in the first half, caught five passes for 68 yards on the drive, the last a 5-yard touchdown reception to make the score 22–19. The Eagles responded by moving the ball 85 yards in 11 plays on a drive that consumed less than five minutes and featured three critical third-down conversions by Foles. The first was a 17-yard pass to Agholor on third-and-6 from the Eagles 19-yard line. Later in the drive, he threw a 14-yard completion to Ertz on third-and-1 from the New England 40-yard line. Finally, he finished the possession with a 22-yard touchdown pass to Clement on third-and-6. The touchdown was upheld upon replay review, as officials confirmed that Clement kept both feet inbounds and controlled the ball. An Elliott extra point brought the score to 29–19 in the Eagles' favor. Brady responded with a 10-play, 75-yard drive, completing all three of his passes for 61 yards, the last one a 26-yard touchdown pass to Hogan that brought the score to 29–26. The Eagles followed with an 8-play, 51-yard drive featuring a 24-yard completion from Foles to Agholor on the first play. By the end of the third quarter, the team had made it to the New England 16-yard line.

The Eagles opened the fourth quarter scoring with a Jake Elliott field goal to bring the score to 32–26. Brady then came back with another 75-yard drive featuring a 30-yard reception by Amendola and ending with a four-yard pass to Gronkowski, his second touchdown of the game, giving the Patriots their first lead of the game with the score at 33–32. On their next drive, the Eagles faced third-and-6 after two plays, but were able to keep the ball with a 7-yard catch by Ertz. Eventually they faced a fourth-and-1 on their own 45-yard line with 5:39 left in the game. Deciding to go for the conversion rather than punt, Foles completed a 2-yard pass to Ertz that kept the drive alive. Then after a 1-yard Blount run, Foles picked up three consecutive first downs with three passes to Agholor for gains of 10, 18, and 10 yards, respectively, moving the ball to the New England 14-yard line. Following a 3-yard run by Ajayi, Foles threw an 11-yard touchdown pass to Ertz with 2:21 remaining in the game. The play was held up on review; Ertz lost the ball after touching the ground in the end zone, but it was determined that he established himself as a runner and maintained control of the ball as he broke the plane of the goal line. A failed two-point conversion left the Eagles with a 38–33 lead.

On the Patriots' next drive, Eagles defensive end Brandon Graham stripped the ball from Brady on the drive's second play for the game's only sack. Eagles rookie defensive end Derek Barnett recovered the ball, allowing the Eagles to run the clock down to 1:05 and force New England to use all their remaining timeouts. Elliott then kicked a 46-yard field goal, putting Philadelphia ahead by eight points, 41–33. New England needed a touchdown and two-point conversion to tie the game and send it into overtime. After nine plays (one of them a 13-yard catch by Amendola on fourth-and-10), Brady reached the 49-yard line, and with only nine seconds remaining, he threw a Hail Mary pass to the end zone as time expired. The pass was incomplete, and the Eagles won their first Vince Lombardi Trophy in franchise history, and their first league championship since 1960, ending the third-longest active championship drought in the NFL at 57 years. The Philadelphia Eagles became just the second team to win a Super Bowl rematch after losing the first Super Bowl meeting (having lost to New England in Super Bowl XXXIX), and the first since the Washington Redskins defeated the Miami Dolphins in Super Bowl XVII (the Miami Dolphins defeated the Washington Redskins in Super Bowl VII). The Eagles also became the first Super Bowl champions since the 1978 Pittsburgh Steelers to defeat both Super Bowl participants from the previous year in the same postseason. Additionally, the NFC East became the first division where every team had won a Super Bowl.

Game statistics

The combined 74 points scored was one point shy of the Super Bowl record of 75, set in Super Bowl XXIX in 1995; it and this game marked only the second time in the game's history where the teams combined for 70+ points. The game also set a record for most yardage by both teams (combined) with 1,151 yards, the most for any single game, regular season or postseason. The game set many other Super Bowl records as well, including fewest punts from both teams (one), most yards gained by a team (613 for New England) and most points scored by a losing team (33).

Nick Foles completed 28 of 43 passes for 373 yards and three touchdowns, with one interception, and caught a touchdown pass. Clement, who caught only 10 passes for 123 yards and two touchdowns during the season, was the Eagles' leading receiver with four receptions for 100 yards and a touchdown, while also rushing for eight yards. Agholor had nine receptions for 84 yards. Blount was the game's top rusher with 90 yards and a touchdown. Brady completed 28 of 48 passes for 505 yards and three touchdowns, breaking the record for most passing yards in a Super Bowl that he had set in the previous season. Amendola was his top target, with eight receptions for 152 yards, while Hogan had six for 128 yards and a touchdown and Gronkowski caught nine for 116 yards and two scores.

Box score

Final statistics

Statistical comparison
The lone Eagles punt was received with a fair catch.

Individual statistics

1Completions/attempts2Carries3Long gain4Receptions5Times targeted

Starting lineups
Source:

Officials
Super Bowl LII had seven officials. The numbers in parentheses below indicate their uniform numbers.
 Referee: Gene Steratore (114)
 Umpire: Roy Ellison (81)
 Down judge: Jerry Bergman (91)
 Line judge: Byron Boston (18)
 Field judge: Tom Hill (97)
 Side judge: Scott Edwards (3)
 Back judge: Perry Paganelli (46)
 Replay official: Paul Weidner
 Alternate Referee: Craig Wrolstad (4)
 Alternate Umpire: Ruben Fowler (71)
 Alternate Wing: Ed Camp (134)
 Alternate Deep: Jimmy Buchanan (86)
 Alternate Back Judge: Greg Steed (12)

This was Steratore's first—and eventually only—Super Bowl as a referee, though he had been previously selected as an alternate for Super Bowl XLIV. Steratore retired from officiating after 15 seasons on June 22, 2018, and joined CBS Sports as a rule analyst starting with the 2018 season.

References

External links

Minnesota Super Bowl Host Committee

2010s in Minneapolis
2017 National Football League season
2018 in American football
2018 in American television
2018 in sports in Minnesota
American football competitions in Minneapolis
February 2018 sports events in the United States
New England Patriots postseason
Philadelphia Eagles postseason
Super Bowl 52